Ron Fisher may refer to:
 Ronald Fisher (1890–1962), English statistician, evolutionary biologist, eugenicist and geneticist
 Ron Fisher (politician) (born 1934), Canadian politician
 Ron Fisher (footballer) (1911–1993), Australian rules footballer 
 Ron Fisher (tennis) in 1958 U.S. National Championships – Men's Singles